Mika John Vukona (born 13 May 1982) is a Fijian-born New Zealand former professional basketball player. Between 2003 and 2018, he spent 13 seasons with the New Zealand Breakers in the Australian NBL and helped them win four championships. He was also a regular with the Nelson Giants in the New Zealand NBL and was a long-time New Zealand Tall Black.

Early life
Vukona was born in Suva, Fiji. He was adopted by his birth mother's brother, a Fijian named Clem. Clem and his a wife, a New Zealander named Marion, moved their family to New Zealand in 1987 following the Fiji coup. They settled down in the coastal city of Tauranga, Marion's hometown.

Vukona attended Bethlehem College in Tauranga for both primary and secondary school. He played rugby until third form at Bethlehem College, when his anti-rugby mother forced him to stop. He subsequently followed his brother's footsteps and took up basketball. He went on to become a member of the national under 16, 18 and 20 sides. Basketball took him to Nelson in his final school year after earning a scholarship to go to Nelson College.

Professional career

Australian NBL
Vukona made his debut in the Australian NBL as a development player during the New Zealand Breakers' inaugural season in 2003–04. He was elevated from a development player to a full-time contracted player for the 2005–06 season. He played five seasons for the Breakers before joining the South Dragons in 2008. He won a championship with the Dragons in 2008–09. After the Dragons collapsed, Vukona joined the Gold Coast Blaze for the 2009–10 season.

In 2010, Vukona made a return to the Breakers, and over the next five seasons, he helped the team win four championships, including three straight between 2010–11 and 2012–13. The 2015–16 season saw the Breakers play in a fifth grand final in six years, where they lost to the Perth Wildcats. In November 2017, Vukona played his 400th NBL game. After eight seasons with the Breakers, Vukona joined the Brisbane Bullets in 2018. Vukona ended the 2018–19 season on 449 games after tearing his Achilles in game one of the Bullets' semi-final series against the Wildcats and thus missing game two. His contract with the Bullets ended at the end of the 2019–20 season.

New Zealand NBL, QSL/NBL1, Lebanon and Italy
Vukona made his New Zealand NBL debut in 2000. He played for the Nelson Giants between 2000 and 2002 before playing for the Manawatu Jets in 2003. He then played for the Giants between 2004 and 2007 before playing for the Harbour Heat in 2008. He played for the Giants between 2010 and 2015, then with the Super City Rangers in 2016, and then again with the Giants in 2018, 2019 and 2020.

In April 2014, Vukona ventured outside New Zealand or Australia for the first time, joining Lebanese team Byblos. Twelve months later, he moved to Italy to play for Virtus Roma.

In 2020, Vukona played for the Southern Districts Spartans of the Queensland State League (QSL). In 2021, he served as an assistant coach for the Spartans in the NBL1 North and joined the playing squad midway through the season.

National team career
Vukona debuted for the Tall Blacks in 2005. He retired from international duties in February 2021 after 152 games for the Tall Blacks.

Personal life
Vukona and his wife Vanessa have two children. Vukona holds a Fijian passport.

In March 2021, Vukona joined the Tasmania JackJumpers' basketball program as a consultant. In November 2022, he was appointed general manager of the Franklin Bulls in the New Zealand NBL.

References

External links
New Zealand Breakers player profile
ANBL stats
Breakers ready to celebrate as captain fantastic Mika Vukona hits 300 not out
No time for reflection
The Value of Vukona
Push for Success Strong as Ever for Mika
Nelson Giants star Mika Vukona cut down by untimely bout of appendicitis

1982 births
Living people
Basketball players at the 2006 Commonwealth Games
Basketball players at the 2018 Commonwealth Games
Brisbane Bullets players
Commonwealth Games medallists in basketball
Commonwealth Games bronze medallists for New Zealand
Commonwealth Games silver medallists for New Zealand
Fijian expatriate basketball people in Australia
Fijian emigrants to New Zealand
Fijian men's basketball players
Gold Coast Blaze players
Harbour Heat players
I-Taukei Fijian people
Manawatu Jets players
Nelson Giants players
New Zealand men's basketball players
New Zealand Breakers players
New Zealand expatriate basketball people in Australia
New Zealand expatriate basketball people in Italy
New Zealand expatriate basketball people in Lebanon
New Zealand people of I-Taukei Fijian descent
Pallacanestro Virtus Roma players
People educated at Nelson College
Power forwards (basketball)
South Dragons players
Sportspeople from Suva
Super City Rangers players
2006 FIBA World Championship players
2010 FIBA World Championship players
2014 FIBA Basketball World Cup players
Medallists at the 2018 Commonwealth Games